Protein Interacting with C Kinase - 1 is a protein that in humans is encoded by the PICK1 gene.

Function 

The protein encoded by this gene contains a PDZ domain, through which it interacts with protein kinase C, alpha (PRKCA). This protein may function as an adaptor that binds to and organizes the subcellular localization of a variety of membrane proteins. It has been shown to interact with multiple glutamate receptor subtypes, monoamine plasma membrane transporters, as well as non-voltage gated sodium channels, and may target PRKCA to these membrane proteins and thus regulate their distribution and function. This protein has also been found to act as an anchoring protein that specifically targets PRKCA to mitochondria in a ligand-specific manner. Three transcript variants encoding the same protein have been found for this gene.

Interactions 

PICK1 has been shown to interact with:

 ACCN2, 
 BNC1, 
 Dopamine transporter, 
 GRIA2,
 GRIA3,
 GRIA4, 
 GRIK1, 
 GRIK2, 
 GRIK3, 
 HER2/neu, 
 Metabotropic glutamate receptor 3,  and
 Metabotropic glutamate receptor 7.

References

Further reading

External links 
Genecards
MGI